Big Brother VIPs 1 was the first celebrity spin-off season of the Belgian version of Big Brother aired in the Flemish Region of Belgium on VTM.

The season was recorded from 20 March 2001 and finished on 30 March 2001 with a total duration of 11 days. The season was prerecorded. The broadcast of the show started on 4 April 2001 and finished on 4 June 2001.

One of the most memorable moments of the show was the fight between Jean-Pierre Van Rossem and Betty Owczarek on Day 1, which even aired on the VTM news.

The winner was Sam Gooris. He didn't receive a money prize but a statue of a golden keyhole.

Since the show was prerecorded and the developments in the house had to be kept secret until the show aired. First evicted housemate Jean-Pierre Van Rossem appeared immediately after his eviction in written media and television programs, talking about the show. Therefore, he broke the contract to be silent, he wasn't paid by the broadcaster. It was decided to air the show faster than its anticipated, although producers stated the decision had nothing to do with Van Rossem's behavior. 

This season received high ratings and appeared on the list of best-watched shows of 2001 with having more than one million viewers.

Format
The VIPs season followed the same concept as the regular season. Differences were that there were no weekly tasks but daily tasks, no public votes for evictions, instead, the celebrity housemates were directly evicted by their housemates when having the most nominations and no live show. In comparison with the regular season, the VIPs season was completely prerecorded. The camera's in the shower and toilet were also switched off.

Since all the celebrity housemates got paid for every day in the house, the winner didn't receive a money prize, but a statue.

Housemates

Daily summary

Nominations table

References

External links
 World of Big Brother

VIP 01
2001 television seasons